Faruq (also Romanized as Fārūq; also known as Pārū) is a village in Khafrak-e Olya Rural District, Seyyedan District, Marvdasht County, Fars Province, Iran. At the 2006 census, its population was 5,227, in 1,361 families.

References 

Populated places in Marvdasht County